Tai Peek Pak Sa was a romantic comedy/drama TV series that aired on Channel 3, it starred Louis Scott, Tisha Tantiprasut and Worawut Niyomsap. It's the fifth drama of project "My hero".

Plot 
Akhin Nopprasit (Louis Scott) who's a commercial pilot can connected with a spirit who's once military pilot in Vietnam War.

Cast

Main cast 

 Louis Scott as Akhin Nopprasit
 Tisha Tantiprasut as Sarisa Phongbunyapha (Risa)
 Worawut Niyomsap as Atsani Phakdinarong

Supporting cast 

 Suriyon Aroonwattanakul as Saran
 Rinlanee Sripen as Anongon Siripanya (Anong)
 Vittaya Wasukraipaisan as Santi Phongbunyapha
 Phanudet Watnasuchat as Sarut 
 Natwara Wongwasana as Ornipha Phakdinarong (On)
 Kritsiri Suksawat as Wiranut (Wi)
 Pisamai Wilaisak as Aemon Nopprasit 
 Duangta Toongkamanee as Sumalee (Nim)
 David Asavanond as Mr. Ferdinand 
 Wethaka Siriwatthana as Nut
 Phollawat Manuprasert as Ayut Nopprasit

Guests 

 Sinjai Plengpanich as Teacher Chanthra
 Songsit Roongnophakunsri as Sarath
 Pakorn Chatborirak as Major Techat Wasutraphaisan (Ben)
 Warintorn Panhakarn as Teacher Patsakorn Wirayakan (Pat)
 Jaron Sorat as Itsara Ratchaphonkun
 Pongsakorn Mettarikanon as Khong Thamdee
 Duanghathai Sathathip as Nid
 Benjapol Cheuyaroon as Kitti

References

External links 

 MY HERO Tai Peek Pak Sa on Thai TV 3
 Tai Peek Pak Sa on Siamzone
 Tai Peek Pak Sa on online-idol
 Cholumpi Production

Thai television soap operas
2010s Thai television series
2018 Thai television series debuts
2018 Thai television series endings
Thai romantic comedy television series
Television shows set in Bangkok
Channel 3 (Thailand) original programming